Amanda Jane Hardy (born 10 December 1971) is a retired female badminton player from Australia. Hardy was a ladies doubles and mixed doubles specialist.

Career 
Hardy competed in badminton at the 1996 Summer Olympics in women's doubles with Rhonda Cator and the mixed doubles with Paul Stevenson. She also competed at the 2000 Summer Olympics in the ladies doubles with Rhonda Cator and the mixed doubles with David Bamford.

Hardy competed at two Commonwealth Games (Victoria 1994 – bronze medal, Kuala Lumpur 1998 – bronze medal).

References

External links 
 
 
 
 
 
 
 

1971 births
Living people
Australian female badminton players
Badminton players at the 1996 Summer Olympics
Badminton players at the 1994 Commonwealth Games
Badminton players at the 2000 Summer Olympics
Badminton players at the 1998 Commonwealth Games
Commonwealth Games bronze medallists for Australia
Olympic badminton players of Australia
Commonwealth Games medallists in badminton
People from Altona, Victoria
Sportspeople from Melbourne
Sportswomen from Victoria (Australia)
Medallists at the 1994 Commonwealth Games
Medallists at the 1998 Commonwealth Games